Gerdab-e Sangi or Gerdau Bardineh (Lurish: گرداوو بردینه) is a historical stony whirlpool from the Sassanid era located in Takhti Square of Khorramabad in lorestan province.
This Building with a diameter of 18 meters and width of 3 meters and a height of 12m of well floor has surrounded around the seasonal well. Well that Gerdab-e-Sangi is fed by it has water from mid-winter to mid-summer and at other times is dry.
The stony whirlpool has been constructed of stone, whereas itself is a mixture of stone and mortar.
Gerdab-e Sangi is registered on the list of National Monuments.

References 

Khorramabad
Buildings and structures in Lorestan Province
Sasanian architecture
Tourist attractions in Khorramabad